Juan de Salamanca Polanco, O.P. (Burgos, c. 1490- Canary Islands, 1538) was a Roman Catholic prelate who served as Bishop of Islas Canarias (1531–1538).

Biography
Juan de Salamanca was ordained a priest in the Order of Preachers. On 6 Mar 1531, he was appointed during the papacy of Pope Clement VII as Bishop of Islas Canarias. He served as Bishop of Islas Canarias until his death in 1538.

References

External links and additional sources
 (for Chronology of Bishops)
 (for Chronology of Bishops)

16th-century Roman Catholic bishops in Spain
Bishops appointed by Pope Clement VII
1538 deaths
Dominican bishops
Year of birth uncertain